Annagassan is a village in the townland of Ballynagassan, County Louth, Ireland. It sits where the River Glyde enters the Irish Sea.

History

Annagassan was first mentioned as Linn Duachaill in AD 841 when the establishment of a Viking longphort was recorded. This has subsequently been confirmed by archaeological work.

In 827, the Annals of Ulster record that the Vikings attacked the Ciannachta people of Louth and north Meath. These early raids were sporadic coastal attacks by small seaborne forces; however, from the 830s, a new phase was characterised by larger fleets, which penetrated up navigable rivers and plundered extensive inland areas. There is a legend that one such Viking was stranded after a raid and settled there. The locals believe this Viking heritage is evidenced by the long-held residence of a seafaring man of "mythic proportions" and wild Scandinavian appearance and demeanour, known to the villagers as "The Bear".

Annagassan was once as important as the Viking settlement at Dubh Linn (The Black Pool). The modern village is generally believed to be built on what archaeologists consider to be a man-made polder structure, constructed to provide shelter for the fjord. The original settlement was located further upstream; navigation was considerably easier on the River Glyde in the 9th century before the intervening build-up of sediment.

Transport

Bus Éireann route 168 provides nine daily journeys to Dundalk, and nine daily journeys to Drogheda, on Mondays and Fridays. The route also passes through Dromiskin, Castlebellingham, Clogherhead, Termonfeckin and Baltray.

See also
 List of towns and villages in Ireland

References

Towns and villages in County Louth
Viking Age populated places